Air Chief Marshal Sir Thomas Lawrie "Jock" Kennedy,  (19 May 1928 – 18 November 2013) was a senior Royal Air Force officer. He served as Deputy Commander of RAF Strike Command from 1979 to 1981, and Air Member for Personnel from 1983 to 1986. Following his retirement from the military, he served as Lord Lieutenant of Rutland.

Early life
Kennedy was born on 19 May 1928 in Hawick, Roxburghshire, Scotland. He was educated at Hawick High School. He was a member of the Boy Scouts.

Military career
In April 1946, Kennedy joined the Royal Air Force as an airman as part of his National Service. He served for six months before being selected for officer training. Having attended Royal Air Force College Cranwell, he was commissioned on 8 April 1949 as a pilot officer. He was awarded the Philip Sassoon Memorial Trophy for best all-round cadet at Cranwell. He was promoted to flying officer on 9 April 1950 with seniority from 8 April 1949, and to flight lieutenant on 8 October 1951. In the 1953 Coronation Honours, Kennedy was awarded the Air Force Cross (AFC).

Kennedy was appointed Deputy Commandant of the RAF Staff College, Bracknell in 1971, Director of Air Support Operations in 1973 and Air Officer Commanding Northern Maritime Air Region at RAF Pitreavie Castle in 1977. He went on to be Deputy Commander-in-Chief, RAF Strike Command in 1979 and was appointed to the combined posts of Commander-in-Chief Royal Air Force Germany and Commander Second Tactical Air Force in 1981. His last appointment was as Air Member for Personnel in 1983 before retiring in 1986.

Later life
In retirement, Kennedy became a Director of Dowty Group. He served as controller of the RAF Benevolent Fund from 1988 to 1993 during which time more than £20 million was raised.

He served as Deputy Lieutenant of Leicestershire and later became Lord Lieutenant of Rutland.

He died on 18 November 2013.

Personal life
In 1959, Kennedy married Margaret Ann Parker. Together they had three children: one son and two daughters.

References

|-
 

|-
 

1928 births
2013 deaths
British military personnel of the Suez Crisis
Deputy Lieutenants of Leicestershire
Knights Grand Cross of the Order of the Bath
Lord-Lieutenants of Rutland
People educated at Hawick High School
People from Hawick
Recipients of the Air Force Cross (United Kingdom)
Royal Air Force air marshals
Royal Air Force personnel of the Korean War